Isabel Mary Mitchell  (1893–1973) was an Australian known for her services to literature. She went blind in the 1940s and wrote about this in "Uncharted country [braille] : aspects of life in blindness." She wrote eight novels after losing her sight through the use of dictaphone and typewriter.

Mitchell also wrote three detective novels under the name Josephine Plain. The Secret of the Sandbank was first published in the Melbourne afternoon daily newspaper The Herald in instalments.

Mitchell was made a Member of the Order of the British Empire in 1970 for service to literature.

Works

Family
She was the daughter of Edward Fancourt Mitchell. Sister of Janet Charlotte Mitchell.

References 

1893 births
1973 deaths
20th-century Australian women writers
Australian Members of the Order of the British Empire
Australian blind people